Lucius Quintus Cincinnatus Lamar II (September 17, 1825January 23, 1893) was an American politician, diplomat, and jurist. A member of the Democratic Party, he represented Mississippi in both houses of Congress, served as the United States Secretary of the Interior, and was an associate justice of the Supreme Court of the United States. He also served as an official in the Confederate States of America.

Born and educated in Georgia, he moved to Oxford, Mississippi, to establish a legal practice. He was elected to the United States House of Representatives in 1856 and served until January 1861, when he helped draft Mississippi's Ordinance of Secession. He helped raise the 19th Mississippi Infantry Regiment and worked on the staff of his wife's cousin, General James Longstreet. In 1862, Confederate President Jefferson Davis appointed Lamar to the position of Confederate minister to Russia. Following the Civil War, Lamar taught at the University of Mississippi and was a delegate to several state constitutional conventions.

Lamar returned to the United States House of Representatives in 1873, becoming the first Mississippi Democrat elected to the House since the end of the Civil War. He remained in the House until 1877, and represented Mississippi in the Senate from 1877 to 1885. He opposed Reconstruction and voting rights for African Americans  but later came to support black suffrage and opposed the 1890 Mississippi Constitution. In 1885, he accepted appointment as Grover Cleveland's Secretary of the Interior. In 1888, the Senate confirmed Lamar's nomination to the Supreme Court, making Lamar the first Southerner appointed to the court since the Civil War. He remained on the court until his death in 1893.

Family and education 
Lamar was born on September 17, 1825 in Putnam County, Georgia, near Eatonton, at the family's  plantation home known as "Fairfield". His parents were Lucius Quintus Cincinnatus Lamar and Sarah Bird; he had five siblings. The elder Lamar, a lawyer and state judge in Georgia, suffered from depression and committed suicide when Lamar was nine years old. Contemporary accounts explained the suicide as resulting from either insanity or severe dyspepsia. Several members of Lamar's family reached prominence in various levels of government. His uncle, Mirabeau Buonaparte Lamar, participated in the Texas Revolution and served as the second president of the Republic of Texas. He was a cousin to Associate Justices of the Supreme Court Joseph Rucker Lamar and John A. Campbell and was related to U.S. Representatives Absalom Harris Chappell and William Bailey Lamar.

Lamar was briefly educated in the Milledgeville school system before being enrolled at the Manual Labor School in Covington, Georgia from 1837 to 1840. The school consolidated with Emory College (now known as Emory University) located in nearby Oxford, Georgia in 1840, leading to Lamar's mother and one of his uncles to move to the town. Lamar was an average student, faring well in subjects he enjoyed and poorly in those he did not. Beyond his studies, he participated in campus debating activities, where he gained experience in public speaking and knowledge of important issues of the time like slavery. He completed his studies in 1845.

At Emory, Lamar began a relationship with Virginia Longstreet, the daughter of Augustus Baldwin Longstreet, president of the college. The couple married in July 1847, and they had four children: L.Q.C. Lamar III, Virginia, Sarah, and Frances. On December 29, 1884, Virginia died from lung disease that had plagued her since 1880.  They were married in the President's House at Emory College in Oxford, GA—today the Dean's Residence at Oxford College of Emory University.

Early career 
In 1845, a few months prior to his twentieth birthday, Lamar moved to Macon, Georgia, where he studied law in his uncle's office for two years. He was admitted to the bar in 1847 in Vienna, Georgia. Afterwards, he moved back to Covington, where he set up his own legal practice. Using the family connections associated with the Longstreet name, Lamar took his first steps into politics when Newton County sent him as a delegate to the state Democratic convention in Milledgeville in 1847 and 1849. Attention at the convention was directed towards the Wilmot Proviso, where Lamar embraced a staunch proslavery position that would not change throughout the antebellum period.

He moved to Oxford, Mississippi in 1849 after A.B. Longstreet became president of the University of Mississippi. He was licensed as a lawyer in June 1850 and in July, he became the assistant professor of mathematics at the university.  He entered Mississippi politics in May 1850, when he addressed a Lafayette County convention on the topic of slavery.  In March 1851, he was actively involved in the local organization of the Southern Rights party in Oxford and was subsequently sent as a delegate to the statewide party convention in Jackson. He campaigned on behalf of party candidate Jefferson Davis for governor and debated Unionist-opponent Henry Foote in Oxford as a spokesman for his party. Despite these efforts, Foote would win the election against Davis by 999 votes.

Faced with dissatisfaction in politics and homesickness, in the summer of 1852, Lamar returned to Covington and entered into a legal partnership with a friend. Lamar reentered politics in Georgia by winning a seat in the Georgia House of Representatives as a member of the Democratic Party in Newton County, which had typically favored Whig candidates. As a legislator, he served as chairman of the Committee on the State of the Republic and as a member of the Agriculture and Internal Improvements, Judiciary, and Public Printing committees; he was also a member of two special committees. Throughout the 1853–1854 term, he focused on issues dealing with the Western and Atlantic Railroad, party politics, and slavery.

Following the end of the legislative term in February 1854, Lamar moved to Macon to open a law office. He sought the Democratic nomination in 1855 for Georgia's 3rd congressional district with the help of former congressman A. H. Chappell, though he failed to gather the necessary votes at the convention. After the election, Lamar left Georgia for the final time to return to Mississippi due to financial troubles, political defeat, and family responsibilities. North of Abbeville, Mississippi, along the Tallahatchie River, Lamar established his  "Solitude" cotton plantation that by 1857 had 26 slaves, though the plantation was never fully developed. He also practiced law in nearby Holly Springs with two local prominent lawyers, C. M. Mott and James L. Autrey.

House of Representatives (1857–1860) 

In 1857, Democratic Congressman Daniel Wright decided not to seek reelection in Mississippi's 1st congressional district. Lamar was suggested as a possible candidate by The Memphis Daily Appeal under the Democratic ticket, though he faced difficulties due to his prior support of Howell Cobb, a leader of the Union movement. Nevertheless, at the convention, he was eventually chosen after numerous indecisive ballots, with Lamar crediting his old friend Jacob Thompson for the win. Strongly supporting the Kansas-Nebraska bill, he campaigned against Whig opponent, James Lusk Alcorn. Lamar won by a comfortable margin and would easily win again in his 1859 reelection campaign against a lack of opposition.

Lamar's antebellum career in congress was primarily focused on sectionalist issues to protect Southern interests in slavery. He was a supporter of the adoption of the proslavery Lecompton Constitution in Kansas without popular ratification. On the morning of February 6, 1858, he was involved in a brawl precipitated by debate on the constitution on the floor of the U.S. House of Representatives, where he fought with congressman Owen Lovejoy. Lamar supported the compromise English Bill created by southerners and President Buchanan. He defended slavery as an institution in a speech in 1860, arguing that not everyone is equal. While he never directly advocated for secession, he warned of it as a possibility if the South was to lose the ability to check the majority abolitionist opinion in the government.

Lamar left Washington on December 12, 1860 to canvass for a seat in the upcoming Mississippi secession convention, and on January 12, 1861, he resigned from Congress alongside the rest of the Mississippi delegation.

Secession 

Lamar travelled to Charleston to participate in the 1860 Democratic Convention as an emissary for Jefferson Davis's message to focus on defeating northern Democrat Stephen Douglas instead of withdrawing from the convention; however, this appeal had little effect on the Mississippi delegation who had already left the convention hall. He later spoke to a large group of southern sympathizers, denouncing Douglas and stating that the Democratic party had irremediably split. He worked with Davis to convince Mississippi's delegates to attend the reconvened national convention in Baltimore. The Mississippi delegates attended, though would later withdraw with other southern delegates because of discontent with the northern Democrat's moderate position on slavery; the southern Democrats would instead nominate John C. Breckinridge for the presidency at their own convention. Following the conventions, Lamar accepted a professorship of mental and moral philosophy at the University of Mississippi and planned to retire from Congress at the session's end.

With the victory of Abraham Lincoln, Mississippi Governor John J. Pettus convened the state's congressional delegation to recommend a policy on secession. While Lamar and Senators Davis and Albert G. Brown favored a moderate approach, urging cooperative secession with other southern states, they were outvoted by the other congressional members; Lamar and the others joined the resolution to make it unanimous. A day after the governor's conference, he proposed a plan for the creation of a confederacy at a mass meeting in Brandon, Mississippi, though it attracted little support by other southern leaders.

On January 7, 1861, Mississippi's secession convention organized, and Lamar was sent as a delegate from Lafayette County. Lamar swiftly moved to establish a committee to prepare an Ordinance of Secession, and by the next day, he was appointed chairman of it. On January 9, the committee presented the Mississippi Secession Ordinance which Lamar had authored prior to the convention; by a vote of 70 to 29, the document passed. On January 10, Lamar was appointed to the Committee on Southern Confederacy, where he introduced resolutions sympathetic to South Carolina's secession and to accept an initiation to meet with other seceding states to form a confederacy. Lamar also worked on a committee to draft a declaration of causes. When the convention reconvened on March 29, 1861, he voted to pass the Provisional Constitution of the Confederate States.

Role in the Confederacy

During the months preceding the Civil War, he continued teaching students at the University of Mississippi, though by June 1861, the university suspended operations because of too few students. Lamar entered active service in the Confederate army, where he and his law partner C. H. Mott organized the 19th Mississippi Regiment of volunteers in Oxford. The regiment registered to the Confederate War Department on May 14, 1861 and subsequently left for Richmond. Mott was commissioned as a colonel with Lamar as a lieutenant colonel. While in Richmond, Lamar gave a closing address to an event headed by Jefferson Davis, where he proclaimed:"This very night I look forward to the day when this beloved country of ours— for, thank God! we have a country at last— will be a country to live for, to pray for, to fight for, and if necessary, to die for."

Before his regiment moved to the front, Lamar suffered vertigo, forcing him to return to Oxford to recover in mid-July 1861. He returned to Richmond in November, and once there he acted as an adviser for Davis, in which he assisted him with an attempt to mend relations with General Joseph Johnston. His unit participated in the Battle of Williamsburg, where Mott was killed in action. Lamar assumed control of the regiment and was praised for his leadership. While preparing for another engagement, Lamar suffered a violent seizure, forcing him to quit combat and head to Richmond to recover. At the same time, Lamar was facing personal issues with his younger brother and his cousin dying in combat. Seeking spiritual help, he joined the Methodist Church in July.

Following improvements to his health, on November 19, 1862, he returned to service, with Davis appointing him as a diplomat to the Russian Imperial Government. He reached Europe on March 1, 1863, though he was eventually given advice by Emperor Napoleon III that a mission to Russia would be fruitless. Lamar assisted other confederate officials in France and England, though he failed to convince audiences in either country to recognize the Confederacy. He received a letter from the Secretary of State Judah Benjamin that the Confederate Senate had refused to confirm him as commissioner to Russia. After receiving the letter, Lamar spent several more months in Europe before leaving on November 1, 1863 from Liverpool. He arrived in Richmond in early January 1864. With his return home, Lamar spent much of the last year of the war giving speeches on Davis' behalf.

On December 3, 1864, he was commissioned as a colonel in the Confederate Army with duty as a judge advocate in Richmond. He acted as an aide to General James Longstreet at the time of the Confederacy's surrender in 1865. He was paroled and released after his surrender.

Post-war period 

After the war, Lamar returned to Oxford to reunite with his family. The war had claimed two brothers and both of his law partners. Lamar's plantation had suffered damage and had its slaves freed; the land was also returned to his father-in-law as he could not maintain payments during the war. Lamar entered into a law partnership with his friend Edward C. Walthall in the Coffeeville hamlet. The successful practice was dissolved following health troubles, leading Lamar to accept a less-demanding professorship position at the University of Mississippi for the fall term of 1866. He taught ethics and metaphysics initially, though by 1867, he was the chair of the law department. He became a member of the Sigma Alpha Epsilon fraternity in 1865 and was among the first initiates in that fraternity's chapter at the University of Mississippi. He became a director of the Mississippi Central Railroad Company in 1867 and entered into a law partnership with E. D. Clark in Oxford in the fall of 1868. From 1868 to 1872, he provided legal services for the railroad company, but by 1877, he had lost his stake when it was absorbed by the Illinois Central Railroad. In 1870, he resigned from his professorship, fearing radicalization of the university and the possibility of admitting Black students after a new governing board was installed.

The house is now known as the L.Q.C. Lamar House Museum and was designated a National Historic Landmark in 1975.

Later career
Lamar returned to the U.S. House of Representatives in 1873, the first Democrat from Mississippi to be elected to the House since the Civil War. He served there until 1877. Lamar was elected by the state legislature (as was the law at the time) to represent Mississippi in the U.S. Senate from 1877 to 1885. Lamar was a staunch opponent of Reconstruction, and did not consider freedmen and other black Americans fit to vote. He promoted "the supremacy of the unconquered and unconquerable Saxon race."

Lamar served as United States Secretary of the Interior under President Grover Cleveland from March 6, 1885, to January 10, 1888. As part of the first Democratic administration in 24 years, and as head of the corrupt Interior Department, which was rife with political patronage, Lamar was besieged by visitors seeking jobs. One day a visitor came who was not seeking a job and, as The New York Times later reported:

In the outer room were several prominent Democrats, including a high judicial officer, several Senators, and any number of members of the House. Mr. Lamar waved his visitor to a chair without saying a word. ... By and by his visitor said that he would go away and return at some other time, as he feared that he was keeping the people outside. "Pray sit still," requested Mr. Lamar. "You rest me. I can look at you, and you do not ask me for anything; and you keep those people out as long as you stay in."

Lamar was notable as one of Cleveland's cabinet members most open to black patronage appointees. As secretary, Lamar removed the department's fleet of carriages for its officials and used only his personal one-horse rockaway light carriage.

Supreme Court 

On December 6, 1887, President Cleveland nominated Lamar to be an associate justice of the Supreme Court of the United States, filling the seat of the late William Burnham Woods. The U.S. Senate confirmed Lamar by a 32–28 vote on January 16, 1888, and was sworn into office two days later. He was the first justice of Southern origin appointed after the Civil War. (Woods, though appointed as a resident of Alabama, had been a native of Ohio and a Republican.) He served on the court until his death.

Lamar died on January 23, 1893, in Vineville, Georgia. He was originally interred at Riverside Cemetery in Macon, Georgia, but was reinterred at St. Peter's Cemetery in Oxford, Mississippi, in 1894.

Memorials and namesakes
During an 1884–85 Geological Survey, geologist Arnold Hague named the east fork of the Yellowstone River in Yellowstone National Park the Lamar River in his honor. The Lamar Valley, or the Secluded Valley of trapper Osborne Russell and other park features or administrative names which contain Lamar are derived from this original naming in honor of Secretary of the Interior Lamar.

Lamar Hall at the University of Mississippi in Oxford is named for him.

Lamar Avenue, a main thoroughfare in Oxford, Mississippi, is also named for him.

The L.Q.C. Lamar House in Oxford, MS was designated in 1975 as a National Historic Landmark for its significance to "Political and Military Affairs 1865–1900." The house operates as a museum and the 3-acre grounds as a park.

Lamar School in Meridian, MS is named for L.Q.C. Lamar.

The Lamar Bathhouse in Hot Springs National Park is named for him.

Emory University had two named professorships in the school of law that were named for Lamar. In April 2022, Emory removed Lamar's name from the professorships after a review by Emory’s Committee on Naming Honors recommended that the name be changed due to his staunch defense of slavery.

Legacy and honors
Three U.S. counties are named in his honor: Lamar County, Alabama; Lamar County, Georgia; and Lamar County, Mississippi, as well as communities in Wisconsin and Colorado. Also named in his honor are at least two roadways: Lamar Blvd in Oxford and Lamar Avenue (US 78, and originally known as Pigeon Roost Road) in Memphis.

During World War II, the Liberty Ship  was named for him.

Lamar was later featured in John F. Kennedy's Pulitzer Prize-winning book, Profiles in Courage (1957), for his eulogy for Massachusetts Senator Charles Sumner (R) in 1874, along with his support of the findings of a partisan congressional committee regarding the disputed presidential election of 1876, and for his unpopular vote against the Bland–Allison Act of 1878.

Notes

References

Citations

Works cited

Further reading 

 
 L.Q.C. Lamar Collection, Archives and Special Collections, J.D. Williams Library, The University of Mississippi
 
 Senate summary of Profiles in Courage https://www.senate.gov/reference/common/generic/Profiles_LL.htm

External links

 
 

|-

|-

|-

|-

|-

|-

|-

|-

1825 births
1893 deaths
19th-century American judges
19th-century American politicians
19th Mississippi Infantry Regiment
Methodists from Mississippi
American slave owners
Cleveland administration cabinet members
Confederate States Army officers
Democratic Party members of the United States House of Representatives from Mississippi
Democratic Party United States senators from Mississippi
Members of the Georgia House of Representatives
People from Covington, Georgia
People from Putnam County, Georgia
People of Mississippi in the American Civil War
United States federal judges appointed by Grover Cleveland
United States Secretaries of the Interior
Justices of the Supreme Court of the United States
Bourbon Democrats
United States senators who owned slaves